Sprenger Brewery, also known as the Excelsior Brewery Complex, is a historic brewery complex located at Lancaster, Lancaster County, Pennsylvania. The complex consists of five buildings and an open area.  The Excelsior Hall was built in 1873, and is a four-story, measuring 33 feet by 105 feet. It features a Victorian storefront that once housed the brewery saloon and a restored heavy, sculptural mansard roof in the Second Empire style.  The remaining buildings are a two-story building with stone basement vaults built about 1857; a 49 feet by 69 feet infill building built about 1910; a Victorian warehouse measuring 44 feet, 6 inches, by 88 feet, 6 inches; and a two-story, brick stable.

It was listed on the National Register of Historic Places in 1979.

References

Brewery buildings in the United States
Industrial buildings and structures on the National Register of Historic Places in Pennsylvania
Second Empire architecture in Pennsylvania
Industrial buildings completed in 1857
Industrial buildings completed in 1873
Industrial buildings completed in 1910
Buildings and structures in Lancaster, Pennsylvania
National Register of Historic Places in Lancaster, Pennsylvania
1857 establishments in Pennsylvania